No Other One may refer to:

"No Other One", a single by Taio Cruz from his album Rokstarr.
"No Other One", a song by Weezer from their album Pinkerton''.